Christina Cox (born July 31, 1971) is a Canadian film and television actress and stuntwoman.

Early life

Christina Cox was born in a town on the outskirts of Toronto, the youngest of three daughters. She is Canadian of Caribbean (Jamaican) descent. She has two older sisters, named Tracey and Melissa. Her father is an automotive executive.

Cox studied theatre and dance at the Arts York program at Unionville High School, and continued her theatre training at the Ryerson Theatre School of Toronto, where she studied for two years.

Cox actively competed in gymnastics, track and field, and taekwondo while in school. She is also proficient in boxing, muay Thai kickboxing, and fencing, and has had training in stage combat, period weaponry, and firearms. During high school, she had aspirations of becoming an Olympic gymnast, but instead chose to focus on drama and theater.

Career

Cox has more than 38 movie and television appearances to her credit. Her best-known movie credits include the 1999 Canadian movie Better Than Chocolate, and the movie The Chronicles of Riddick.  She received a Gemini Award nomination for her performance as Angela Ramírez in F/X: The Series. Cox was an original member of the UPN sitcom Girlfriends, cast as Lynn, for the pilot episode.

Cox has appeared in numerous national theater productions, including Shakespeare's Twelfth Night, and Jim Cartwright's Road.

She is also a trained stuntwoman.  She performed boxing stunt work for Hilary Swank in Million Dollar Baby.

Cox's first role as a main character in a television series was that of Vicki Nelson in Blood Ties, a supernatural detective series based on the novels by Tanya Huff. Tanya Huff later said, "Back when Christina Cox was doing F/X: The Series, I used to point at the screen and announce, 'When she's a little older, she'd be brilliant as Vicki!"

She starred as astronaut-biologist Jen Crane in ABC's 2009 summer show Defying Gravity. Cox also appeared in a Season Four episode of Showtime's series Dexter, playing villainous police officer Zoey Kruger. She was in the cast of the 2011 ABC summer drama Combat Hospital (aka The Hot Zone), alongside Elias Koteas and Deborah Kara Unger.

Personal life
Cox is married to Grant Mattos, a former NFL wide receiver for the San Diego Chargers. They eloped on October 1, 2010, soon after his return from competing on Survivor: Redemption Island. They have a daughter, Flynn, who was born in December 2013.

Filmography

Film

Television

Web

Awards

References

External links

Official Christina Cox Website
 Le premier blog français, depuis 2006
 Le premier site en Français

1971 births
Actresses from Toronto
Canadian television actresses
Canadian film actresses
Living people
Canadian people of Jamaican descent
20th-century Canadian actresses
21st-century Canadian actresses
Black Canadian actresses